Heteroderces oxylitha is a moth in the family Lecithoceridae. It was described by Edward Meyrick in 1929. It is found in Assam, India.

The wingspan is 10–11 mm. The forewings are light brownish ochreous, with the bases of the scales tinged with whitish and the base of the costa suffused with dark fuscous. The stigmata are black, the first discal forming an oval spot touching a dot before it, the plical linear, obliquely before the first discal, the second discal moderate, tending to be linear. An elongate mark of dark fuscous suffusion is found on the costa above the second discal veins posteriorly tending to be streaked fuscous. There are also some small black angular dots on the termen. The hindwings are light grey.

References

Moths described in 1929
Lecithoceridae